"Sing My Heart" is a song composed by Harold Arlen, with lyrics written by Ted Koehler.  It was written in 1939 for the movie Love Affair and first sung by Irene Dunne.

Notable recordings

Will Osborne & His Orchestra - recorded for Decca on February 15, 1939 (catalog No. 2335B).
Ella Fitzgerald - Ella Fitzgerald Sings the Harold Arlen Songbook (1961)
Lena Horne - The Men in My Life (1988)

References

Songs with music by Harold Arlen
Songs with lyrics by Ted Koehler
1939 songs
Irene Dunne songs